Gérard Hérold (Mulhouse, 10 September 1939 - Paris, 19 August 1993) was a French actor, appearing in several films, TV series and on theatre.

Biography
Gérard Hérold was born in Alsace in Mulhouse (Haut-Rhin) on 10 September 1935. He studied acting at the School of Dramatic Art in Strasbourg. In Paris, he was able to complete his artistic training by working with actor and director Antoine Vitez and also Gérard Vergez.

He started performing in 1967 in the soap opera La vie begins at midnight in the role of 'Roland Sénéchal' alongside Geneviève Fontanel. In 1973, he played the hero in Les Fraises d'automne and King Alphonse V in the soap opera Le Secret des Flamands with Isabelle Adjani and Jean-Claude Dauphin. Édouard Molinaro then hired him in 1975 for the role of 'Delorme' in his film The Pink Phone co-starring with Mireille Darc, then by Michel Drach for Tell Me About Love (Parlez-moi d'amour), Pierre Granier-Deferre for Farewell, Chicken co-starring with Lino Ventura and José Giovanni and then in 1976 for Comme a Boomerang with Alain Delon.

In 1977, Philippe Monnier gave Gerard Hérold the role of 'Bill' alongside Claude Brasseur in Monsieur Papa and then director Robert Lamoureux gave him the role of 'Commander Gilles' in The Seventh Company in the Moonlight in 1977. Other roles in 'Death of a Rotten' with Alain Delon and the interpretation of Alain Valdez in 2 of Molinaro's films with Marie-Hélène Breillat, 'Claudine goes away' and 'Claudine en ménage'.

In the 1980s, Alain Delon hired him for his films For the Skin of a Cop and The Battant. In the German series Lindenstraße by Hans W. Geißendörfer, Gérard Hérold performed the role of 'Frédéric de Pasquale' and 'Jean-Luc Mourrait', the lover of Tanja Schildknecht (Sybille Waury). His last role was Patrick, in 1991 alongside Gerard Depardieu in My father, the hero as 'Gerard Lauzier'.

He also performed on stage in various plays, including in 1958 at Théâtre National de Strasbourg.

He was married to actress Catherine Navarro and had a daughter named Anne. He died of a heart attack on 19 August 1993.

Filmography

Film

Television

References

Bibliography
 Georges Foessel, "Gerard Georges Herold", in New Dictionary of Alsatian Biography, vol. 16, p. 1540
 Yvan Foucart, Dictionary of French comedians missing 694 portraits, 2147 names, Mormoiron, Y. Foucart, 2007, 1185 p.

1935 births
1993 deaths
Actors from Mulhouse
French male film actors
French male television actors
French male stage actors
20th-century French male actors